{{DISPLAYTITLE:C25H31NO3}}
The molecular formula C25H31NO3 (molar mass: 393.52 g/mol, exact mass: 393.2304 u) may refer to:

 HT-0712, also known as IPL-455903
 Testosterone nicotinate

Molecular formulas